Team Illuminate is an American UCI Continental cycling team established in 2014.

Team history
Team Illuminate grew out of the 2015 Airgas–Safeway team that included 2013 Vuelta a España winner Chris Horner. The team launched the 2016 season with success at the 2.1 rated Tour of Taiwan. Later in the season the team became the first US team to compete in Iran, where US rider Connor McCutcheon captured a stage win and wore the yellow jersey in the 2.1 rated Tour of Iran.

In December 2016, the organisation announced that it was adding a UCI Women's Team for the 2017 season.

Team roster

Major wins
2016
Stage 1 Tour of Iran, Connor McCutcheon

2017
Stages 1 & 4 Tour de Taiwan, Edwin Avila
Stage 1 Sibiu Cycling Tour, Edwin Avila
Stage 4 Tour d'Azerbaïdjan, Edwin Avila
Stage 6 Vuelta a Colombia, Griffin Easter
Stage 2 Tour of Rwanda, Simon Pellaud

2018
Points classification Tour of Thailand, Martin Laas
 Stages 4, 5 & 6, Martin Laas
Stage 8 Tour of Japan, Martin Laas
Stage 1 Baltic Chain Tour, Martin Laas
Stage 9 Tour of Hainan, Simon Pellaud

2019
Stage 6 The Princess Maha Chakri Sirindhorn's Cup, Martin Laas
Overall Tour of Taiyuan, Cameron Piper
Points classification, Martin Laas
Stage 1, Cameron Piper
Stage 2, 3, 5 & 6, Martin Laas
Stages 2, 4 & 5 Tour de Korea, Martin Laas

National champions
2016
 Australian U23 Time Trial, Callum Scotson
 Colombian Road Race, Edwin Avila

2019
 Colombian Track (Scratch race), Félix Alejandro Barón Castillo

References

External links

UCI Continental Teams (America)
Cycling teams established in 2014
Cycling teams based in the United States
2014 establishments in the United States